Admiral Watson may refer to:

Anthony Watson (admiral) (born 1949), U.S. Navy rear admiral
Bertram Watson (1887–1976), British Royal Navy vice admiral
Burges Watson (1846–1902), British Royal Navy rear admiral
Charles Watson (Royal Navy officer) (1714–1757), British Royal Navy vice admiral
Dymock Watson (1904–1988), British Royal Navy vice admiral
Fischer Watson (1884–1960), British Royal Navy rear admiral
George Watson (Royal Navy officer) (1827–1897), British Royal Navy admiral
Hugh Watson (1872–1954), British Royal Navy admiral
James A. Watson (born 1956), U.S. Coast Guard rear admiral
John C. Watson (1842–1923), U.S. Navy admiral
Philip Watson (1919–2009), British Royal Navy vice admiral